Llanelli Waterside is the marketing name given to the new suburb development in the coastal strip south west of the town of Llanelli, Wales.  The scheme is a joint development between Carmarthenshire County Council and the Welsh Assembly Government.  The project aims to create a mix of residential housing and business premises from reclaimed industrial land.

Development zones
The project is divided into five zones:

North Dock
A commercial, leisure and retail development is planned for the dock rim.  The comprises  and forecast outputs are 1,000 homes,  of business and office space and 25,000 sq. metres of commercial leisure developments.

Delta Lakes
Delta lakes is a  site adjacent to the coastal link road.  A high tech business park is proposed with both office blocks and commercial sites.  Live/Work units are also planned.

Sandywater Park
A mixed residential and leisure development is planned in this  site situated next to a lake in west Llanelli.

Old Castle Works
Old Castle Works is a 7.5 acre (30,000 m2) brownfield re-development site with commercial and leisure development planned.

Carmarthenshire County Council has recently cleared this derelict site.  The Grade 2 listed Tinning House has been retained, and will be incorporated into any future development 

In May 2007, an application was made for funding from the Big Lottery Fund.  Named "The Works", the development would consist of an open plaza linking the two primary facilities – a cultural centre consisting of an auditorium, TV studio and an art-house cinema and the grade 2 listed tinning shed which would be transformed into a restaurant and  craft gallery. "The Works" would act in partnership with Coleg Sir Gar, a local college, which would have use of the facilities for education purposes.

On 27 October 2007, Carmarthenshire County Council announced that the lottery bid had been unsuccessful, and that other means of funding the development would need to be considered.

Machynys
The Machynys area is planned to have a range of residential developments in the Machynys peninsula beside the Machynys Golf Course.

References

Sources
WDA: Llanelli Waterside
Developer shrugs off credit crunch with new waterside project

Llanelli